The A39 autoroute, also known as the L'Autoroute Verte, is a motorway in eastern France. The road connects Dijon with Dole and Bourg en Bresse.  It forms part of European route E21.

Characteristics
 The road is 142 km long from junction 1
 There are 3 Service Areas
 The road provides quicker travel times between Bourg-en-Bresse and Paris.

History
 1992 : Opening of section between Dijon and Crimolois (6 km)
 1994 : Opening of the section between Crimolois and Dole (34 km)
 1998 : Opening of the section between Dole and Bourg-en-Bresse (110 km)

Junctions

References

A39